Shandilya (IAST: Śāṇḍilya) is a Brahmin gotra, named after the Rishi Shandilya, specifying that individuals of the gotra have Shandilya as one of their patrilineal ancestors. Shandilya Rishi was the progenitor of the Śāṇḍilya gotra, which is also the highest Brahmin gotras. The name derives from the Sanskrit words Śaṇ, and Dilam, thus meaning Full Moon, therefore implying Śāṇḍilya to be the priest of the Moon God This gotra has three pravar, they are Sandilya, Asit and Deval. The Ved of this gotra is Samveda. This gotra is one of the eight highest gotra in Brahmins. Sandilya gotra is the largest gotra in Maithil Brahmins. There are 44 mool (origin) of Sandilya gotra in Maithil Brahmins.

Though most of his descendants patrilineal stay in the north in places like Assam and West Bengal, several have moved to South as well. A daughter of Shandilya married one of the hundred sons of Ikshvaku and moved to the southern state of modern day Orissa. In an undisclosed temple in south, an ancient text records the exact history. I don't deny there might be more but I know of only one such temple. The manuscript also prophesies that a person of this lineage is going to revive the Suryavamsha before the fall of the next century, and in centuries to come the family will once more attain its glory and unify the Indian subcontinent.

References

Gotras
Brahmin communities